Miyauchi Station is the name of multiple train stations in Japan.

 Miyauchi Station (Hiroshima) in Hiroshima Prefecture
 Miyauchi Station (Niigata) in Niigata Prefecture
 Miyauchi Station (Yamagata) in Yamagata Prefecture